Ariccia is a 1874 oil painting on canvas by George Inness.

References

1874 paintings
Paintings in the collection of the Timken Museum of Art